The fountains of Barcelona, in Spain, are a group of various jets of water that are utilized for the public benefit, or as ornamental elements to preexisting fountains, lakes, rivers, waterfalls, or diverse architectural installation. They can vary from the simplest pipe of water or the traditional symmetrical fountain, to complex arrays of founts decorated with sculptures or other ornamental elements. These fountains, as well as the various sculptures across the city, constitute an excellent example of the public art of Barcelona, which has so defined the City Condal. Many of the city's fountains add to its functional character an ornamental facet that, like the rest of its municipal art, has varied over time according to the artistic tendencies of the times, and has left the Catalan capital a collection of works admired greatly both by the citizens and by visitors. In Barcelona there are some 1,800 public fountains, among which there are some 600 that produce drinkable water, and some 200 that are chiefly considered  ornamental.

In the past, the fountains were installed in squares or central places in the villages chiefly to furnish a supply of water for the population. Upon the establishment of a source for this basic need, the water source became a location of public gathering for social exchange. Thereafter, these places increasingly gained importance and ornamentation, eventually turning into the monuments that they are today.

List of fountains 
 Font de Canaletes
 Magic Fountain of Montjuïc

See also 

 Urban planning of Barcelona

References 

Fountains in Barcelona